Glendale School District may refer to one of the school districts in the United States:

Glendale-River Hills School District, serving Glendale, Wisconsin
Glendale School District (Oregon), serving Glendale, Oregon
Glendale School District (Pennsylvania), serving parts of Cambria and Clearfield counties in Pennsylvania
Glendale Unified School District, serving Glendale, California
Glendale Union High School District, serving Glendale, Arizona
Glendale School District (Arkansas), former school district in Arkansas